The 2015–16 Ball State Cardinals women's basketball team represented Ball State University during the 2015–16 NCAA Division I women's basketball season. The Cardinals, led by fourth year head coach Brady Sallee, played their home games at Worthen Arena as members of the West Division of the Mid-American Conference. They finished the season 22–10, 13–5 in MAC play and finished the season in second place in the West Division. They lost in the quarterfinals of the MAC women's tournament to Eastern Michigan. They were invited to the Women's National Invitation Tournament where defeated Iowa in the first round before losing in the second round to Saint Louis.

Roster

Schedule
Source: 

|-
!colspan=9 style="background:#C41E3A; color:#FFFFFF;"| Exhibition

|-
!colspan=9 style="background:#C41E3A; color:#FFFFFF;"| Non-conference regular season

|-
!colspan=9 style="background:#C41E3A; color:#FFFFFF;"| MAC regular season

|-
!colspan=9 style="background:#C41E3A; color:#FFFFFF;"| MAC Women's Tournament

|-
!colspan=9 style="background:#C41E3A; color:#FFFFFF;"| WNIT

See also
 2015–16 Ball State Cardinals men's basketball team

References

Ball State Media Guide
Ball State Record Book

Ball State
Ball State Cardinals women's basketball seasons
2016 Women's National Invitation Tournament participants
Ball
Ball